Mõisanurme is a village in Elva Parish, Tartu County, Estonia. It has a population of 198 (as of 1 January 2012).

The ruins of Kavilda stronghold is located in Mõisanurme. There's also Kavilda St. Alexander's Orthodox church.

References

Villages in Tartu County